The Red Moore Show is a 1962 Australian television series which aired on ABC. Starring Red Moore, it also featured Peggy Mortimer (wife of Enzo Toppano and mother of Peta Toppano) and Colin Croft. The series was a half-hour variety show, and aired for a single series.

Reception
The Sydney Morning Herald gave the show a mixed review, saying that "I feel that someone has slipped badly" but also that "If both Moore and producer Upshaw can come up with a swift bit of pruning, the Red Moore Show could still come through with flying colours".

See also
The Toppanos

References

External links
The Red Moore Show on IMDb

1962 Australian television series debuts
1962 Australian television series endings
Black-and-white Australian television shows
English-language television shows
Australian variety television shows
Australian Broadcasting Corporation original programming